David Daniell is an American guitarist and composer active in experimental music, improvisation and electroacoustic composition.

He has been active with the trio San Agustin since 1996. He has also collaborated with Loren Connors, Rhys Chatham, Tony Buck, Oren Ambarchi, Christian Fennesz, Tim Barnes, Ateleia, Jeph Jerman, Thurston Moore, Sean Meehan, Tomas Korber, Greg Davis and Jonathan Kane, and currently works in an ongoing duo with Douglas McCombs.

He founded the record label Antiopic in New York City in 2002 with James Elliott. Daniell relocated to Chicago, Illinois in 2006, and to Western North Carolina in 2011.

Discography

Solo albums 
I IV V I (2008) released by Table of the Elements
The Hideout (2008) released by Antiopic
Los Jacintos (2008) released by Antiopic
Coastal (2006) released by Xeric/Table of the Elements
sem (2002) released by Antiopic

With San Agustin 
 see San Agustin

Other collaborations 
 David Daniell and Douglas McCombs: Sycamore (2009) released by Thrill Jockey
 Christian Fennesz / David Daniell / Tony Buck: Knoxville (2010) released by Thrill Jockey
 David Daniell and Douglas McCombs: Versions (2012), produced by Bundy K. Brown and released by Thrill Jockey

See also 
San Agustin, a band with David Daniell, Andrew Burnes and Bryan Fielden
Table of the Elements, a record label releasing David Daniell's recent solo work
Antiopic, the record label founded by David Daniell

Notes

External links 
David Daniell, official site.
.

American experimental guitarists
American male guitarists
American electronic musicians
Free improvisation
Electroacoustic improvisation
Living people
Guitarists from Georgia (U.S. state)
Guitarists from Chicago
Year of birth missing (living people)